The 2010 Elite League speedway season (also known as the Sky Sports Elite League for sponsorship reasons) was the 76th season of the top division of UK speedway and the 14th since its establishment in 1997.

Summary
The first fixtures of the season took place on 29 March and the season ended on 27 October. The Wolverhampton Wolves were the defending champions from 2009.

The negative side of playoffs was experienced during the 2010 season when Coventry Bees claimed the title. Coventry had finished in the fourth and final play off spot, 26 points behind regular season table winners Poole Pirates, who in turn had finished 20 points ahead of their nearest rivals racking up 78 points in total. Coventry went on to win their semi final and then defeat Poole in the final. Although Poole won the Knockout Cup there was a distinct feeling of an injustice. Poole's Australian contingent of Chris Holder, Darcy Ward, Davey Watt and Jason Doyle had been consistent all season except during the play off final and Coventry's Polish duo of Krzysztof Kasprzak and Przemysław Pawlicki both hit great form on the night.

League table

Home: 3W = Home win by 7 points or more; 2W = Home win by between 1 and 6 points 
Away: 4W = Away win by 7 points or more; 3W = Away win by between 1 and 6 points; 1L = Away loss by 6 points or less
M = Meetings; D = Draws; L = Losses; F = Race points for; A = Race points against; +/- = Race points difference; Pts = Total Points

Championship play-offs

Semi-finals

Leg 1

Leg 2

Grand final

First leg

Second leg

Coventry were declared Elite League Champions, on Aggregate 101-79.

Elite League Knockout Cup
The 2010 Elite League Knockout Cup was the 72nd edition of the Knockout Cup for tier one teams. Poole Pirates were the winners of the competition.

First round

Quarter-finals

Semi-finals

Final

First leg

Second leg

The Poole Pirates were declared Knockout Cup Champions, winning on aggregate 95-90.

Final leading averages

Riders & final averages
Belle Vue

 8.70
 7.44
 6.77	
 6.11
 6.08
	5.73	
 4.66
	4.47
3.87
 3.73
 2.80

Coventry

 9.02
 8.80
 7.25
 7.08
 7.00
 6.56
 6.29
 6.11
 4.39
 3.65
 3.38

Eastbourne

 8.29
 7.56
 7.26
 6.27
 6.04
 5.93
 5.44
 4.61
 4.34

Ipswich

 9.34 
 7.39
 6.79
 6.56
 6.07
 5.83
 5.67
 5.03
 3.71
 3.69
 3.61
 2.11

Lakeside

 9.35
 8.17
 7.64
 6.87
 6.10
 5.96
 5.49
 5.29
 4.73
 4.64				

Peterborough

 9.62 
 7.93
 7.48
 7.25
 6.39
 5.04
 4.90
 4.46
 3.95
 2.38

Poole

 8.83
 8.58
 8.01 
 7.93
 6.89
 6.74
 6.25

Swindon

 9.90
 8.21
 6.81
 6.62
 6.52
 5.91
 4.39
 3.86
 3.55

Wolverhampton

 10.23
 7.54
 6.91
 6.89
 6.72
 6.52
 5.30
 5.26
 3.55

See also 
 Speedway in the United Kingdom
 List of United Kingdom Speedway League Champions
 Knockout Cup (speedway)

References

SGB Premiership
Elite League
Speedway Elite